The American Vaudeville Museum (AVM) was a vaudeville history and memorabilia museum in Edgewood, New Mexico which moved its collection to the University of Arizona and online.

The museum was founded by Frank Cullen and Donald McNeilly. The museum posted historic content online and published Vaudeville Times magazine quarterly from 1998 to 2008  Its virtual museum included a bibliography of sources and an index of vaudevillians. The museum was founded in 1986.

References

External links
 American Vaudeville Museum website
 University of Arizona Vaudeville Archive

Defunct museums in New Mexico
Vaudeville
Virtual museums
University of Arizona
University museums in Arizona